Heinrich von Bibra (Heinrich VIII of Fulda), Prince-Bishop, Prince-Abbot of Fulda (1711–1788) was Prince-Bishop and Prince-Abbot from 1759 to 1788.  As part his role as Prince-Abbot of Fulda, he had the additional role as Archchancellor (Erzkanzler) of the Holy Roman Empress.

Biography
Born in 1711 at Schnabelwaid as Karl Sigmund von von Bibra, son of General Heinrich Karl, Baron von Bibra (1666-1734) and his wife Maria Johanna Theresia von Eyb (b. 1685). He was raised in a strict household with ten brothers and sisters. He entered the Benedictine Order in 1730 receiving the name Heinrich. He studied philosophy, theology, and law. Six years later he traveled to Rome.

In 1759 immediately after his selection as Prince Bishop and Abbot of Fulda, he had to flee his realm as it was overrun by both the French and the Hessians in the Seven Years' War. Finally with peace in 1763, he undertook the rebuilding of Fulda and its economy. Rising at 4 am each morning, he was an energetic and enlightened ruler. With currency reform came sound money. He built roads, bridges, housing, churches, and orphanages. He improved the spa at Brückenau, had the land surveyed for minerals, and founded the porcelain works which became famous. The porcelain works was disbanded shortly after his death. 

He provided freedom of religion, forbidding mistreatment of Jews and employed Protestants alongside Catholics in his administration. Beginning in 1777 with the exception of the theological faculty every Protestant could acquire academic degrees in all faculties of the University of Fulda. Along with libraries around the land, he introduced a general school system which was one of the best of his time.  Heinrich-von-Bibra-Schule a Realschule (type of secondary school) in Fulda is named after him.

Schloss Johannisberg - riesling - Spätlese - Auslese
During Heinrich’s reign Fulda owned Schloss Johannisberg (Geisenheim, in the Rheingau region). The origin of the famous late harvest riesling of Johannisberg originated in 1775. The story is that producers at Schloss Johannisberg traditionally awaited the permission of the estate owner before cutting their grapes. In this year, for reasons unknown, Heinrich was otherwise engaged and the cutting was delayed for three weeks, time enough for the Botrytis to take hold and produce the first thoroughly infected Spätlese. An Auslese followed in 1787. See Noble rot and Schloss Johannisberg

Family

Heinrich was a member of the aristocratic Franconian von Bibra family which among its members were Lorenz von Bibra, Prince-Bishop of Würzburg, Duke in Franconia (1459–1519), Lorenz’ half brother, Wilhelm von Bibra Papal emissary, Conrad von Bibra, Prince-Bishop of Würzburg, Duke in Franconia (1490–1544) and Ernst von Bibra (1806–1878), naturalist and author.

Photo gallery

Literature
MARINA VON BIBRA, Heinrich VIII. - Fürstbischof von Fulda. In: Gerhard Pfeiffer (Hg.), Fränkische Lebensbilder, Bd. 4, Würzburg 1971, 213-229;
WILHELM FREIHERR VON BIBRA, Beiträge zur Familien-Geschichte der Reichsfreiherm von Bibra, Bd. 3/I, München 1888, 230-255; Ders., Geschichte der Familie von Bibra. München 1870, 148-150;
A. GNAU, Das kirchliche Wirken Heinrich VIII. von Bibra, Fürstbischofs von Fulda (1759–1788), in: Mitteilungen des Historischen Vereins der Diözese Fulda 6 (1902) 12-19;
JOHANN EBERHARD VON KAISER, Regierungsgeschichte des jetztigen Fürsten-Bischofs Heinrich des VIII. zu Fulda im Grundriße, Vornehmlich in Hinsicht der innern Landes-Anstalten und Verbesserungen, in: Patriotisches Archiv für Deutschland 2 (1785) 1-102;
WERNER KATHREIN, Bibra, Heinrich, in: Erwin Gatz (Hg.), Die Bischöfe des Heiligen Römischen Reiches 1648-1803, Berlin 1990, 29f.;
JOSEF LEINWEBER, Die Fuldaer Äbte und Bischöfe, Frankfurt a.M. 1989, 159-163;
MICHAEL MÜLLER, Fürstbischof Heinrich von Bibra und die katholische Aufklärung im Hochstift Fulda (1759–88). Wandel und Kontinuität des kirchlichen Lebens, 451 pp., Fulda 2005.
PETER ADOLPH WINKOPP, Beiträge zur Lebensgeschichte Heinrich des achten Fürstbischofen zu Fulda, welcher am 25. September 1788 das Zeitliche mit dem Ewigen verwechselte, in: Der neue deutsche Zuschauer 1 (1789) 93-102.134-144;
KLAUS WITTSTADT, Der Bibliotheksgründer Fürstbischof Heinrich VIII. von Bibra (1759–1788), in: Artur Brall (Hg.), Von der Klosterbibliothek zur Landesbibliothek. Beiträge zum zweihundertjährigen Bestehen der Hessischen Landesbibliothek Fulda (Stuttgart 1978) 269-293;
F. ZWENGER, Heinrich v. Bibra. Fürstbischof von Fulda, in: BuBl 4 (1923) 139f., 143f., 148 [Weitgehend auf Wilhelm von Bibra beruhend];

External links
Coinarchives's Photos and information on completed coin sales of Heinrich von Bibra coins
Heinrich von Bibra Page on vonbibra.net
Heinrich-von-Bibra-Schule

1711 births
1788 deaths
18th-century German Roman Catholic bishops
Prince-bishops in the Holy Roman Empire
German abbots
Heinrich von Bibra
Barons of the Holy Roman Empire
Roman Catholic bishops of Fulda